Georg Ehnes  (September 27, 1920 - April 27, 1991) is a German politician, representative of the Christian Social Union of Bavaria. He was a member of the Landtag of Bavaria.

See also
List of Bavarian Christian Social Union politicians

References

Christian Social Union in Bavaria politicians
1920 births
1991 deaths
Knights Commander of the Order of Merit of the Federal Republic of Germany